The  is a professional golf tournament on the Japan Golf Tour. It was founded in 1970 and is played at the Miyoshi Country Club (West Course), Miyoshi, Aichi. It is usually held in October. The purse in 2019 was ¥110,000,000 with ¥22,000,000 going to the winner.

Winners

Notes

References

External links
Coverage on the Japan Golf Tour's official site
 

Golf tournaments in Japan
Japan Golf Tour events
Recurring sporting events established in 1970
1970 establishments in Japan